Lakhahi Raj was a prominent Zamindari estate in the former State of United Provinces of British India. It was established in about 1461 as Usiya(an independent kingdom). Its first king was Maharaja Kalyan Mal and last ruling chief was Raja Viswanath Bux Singh. Lakhahi Raj was ruled by Rathore dynasty.

History
 In the Year 1461, Maharaja Kalyan Mal Rathore who founded Usiya later Lakhahi migrated from Jodhpur. He conquered the local tarai region with some of his relatives who the jangras a branch of Chauhans . Total number of Villages which were conqured were Nine hundred and eighty nine (989). The region was under banjaaras when Maharaja Kalyan Mal came here. The Royal Family is descended from the House of Rathore Rajputs of Jodhpur – Marwar. Jodhpur is now in the Indian State of Rajasthan. Lakhahi became a part of United Provinces of Agra and Oudh after Independence and now the erstwhile estate is a part of kheri district Uttar Pradesh, India. The Raj was Made a Zamindari in 19th Century.

Shri Janglinath Mahadev Mandir 
An enormous temple of Lord Shiva named Shri Janglinath Mahadev temple was built on the outskirts of Raj by Maharaja Ram bux Singh Rathore of Lakhahi in the early 18th century.

Rulers
From about 1461 the rulers were:

 Rao Shri Akhai Raj Rathore
 Maharaja Shri Kalyan Mal Rathore.He came from Jodhpur- Marwar  and established the Raj of Usiya( Lakhahi)
 Maharaja Shri Bheetal Das Rathore. 
 Maharaja Shri Beni Singh  Rathore.
 Maharaja Shri Fateh Singh  Rathore. 
 Maharaja Shri Shiv Singh Rathore
 Maharaja Shri Ram Baksh Singh Rathore.
 Maharaja Shri Bakhat Singh Rathore. According to the beliefs In his time only  Lakhahi was merged into British India and made Zamindari.
 Raja Shri Harharatmak Singh Rathore.
 Raja Shri Viswanath Baksh Singh Rathore till 1952 and then Titular till 1972 (b.1900 d.1972)

Erstwhile Rulers

Raja Shri Viswanath Baksh Singh Rathore till 1952 and then Titular till 1972 (b.1900 d.1972)
 
 

 
 Raja Dr. Munendra Pal Singh Rathore , present Titular Raja of Lakhahi since 1972–present

See also
Rathores
Lakhimpur kheri district

References 	

Zamindari estates
Rajput estates